Echo was launched at Kingston upon Hull in 1799. She quickly became a West Indiaman, sailing between Britain and Jamaica under a number of owners and masters. In 1826–1828 she made one voyage to Bengal, sailing under a licence from the British East India Company (EIC). On her return to Liverpool, she immediately sailed for Canada, and was lost on 22 May 1828 near Lubec, Maine.

Career
Echo first appeared in Lloyd's Register (LR), in 1800.

In 1813 the EIC had lost its monopoly on the trade between India and Britain. British ships were then free to sail to India or the Indian Ocean under a licence from the EIC.

Captain Thompson sailed from London on 28 October 1826 under a licence from the EIC, bound for Bengal. Echo arrived at Bengal on 15 May 1827.

Homeward bound, she sailed from Saugor Roads on 8 November. She sailed from St Helena on 12 January 1828, and arrived at Liverpool on 27 February 1828.

On 19 April 1828, Echo, Milne, master, sailed from Liverpool for Saint John, New Brunswick.

Fate
Her crew and part of her cargo were saved.

Echo was no longer listed in the issues for 1829 of Lloyd's Register, or the Register of Shipping.

Notes

Citations

References
 

1799 ships
Ships built in Kingston upon Hull
Merchant ships of the United Kingdom
Age of Sail merchant ships
Maritime incidents in May 1828